Mehranrud-e Markazi Rural District is in the Central District of Bostanabad County, East Azerbaijan province, Iran. At the census of 2006, its population was 19,216 in 3,856 households; there were 18,822 inhabitants in 4,836 households at the following census of 2011; and in the most recent census of 2016, the population of the rural district was 18,380 in 5,242 households. The largest of its 21 villages was Kord Kandi, with 4,439 people.

References 

Bostanabad County

Rural Districts of East Azerbaijan Province

Populated places in East Azerbaijan Province

Populated places in Bostanabad County